The 2010 Aegon International was a combined men's and women's tennis tournament played on outdoor grass courts. It was the 36th edition of the event for the women and the 2nd edition for the men. It was classified as a WTA Premier tournament on the 2010 WTA Tour and as an ATP World Tour 250 series on the 2010 ATP World Tour. The event took place at the Devonshire Park Lawn Tennis Club in Eastbourne, United Kingdom from 13 June until 19 June 2010.

ATP entrants

Seeds

 Seedings are based on the rankings as of June 7, 2010.

Other entrants

The following players received wildcards into the main draw:
  Jamie Baker
  Gilles Simon
  James Ward

The following qualified for the main draw:
  Martin Emmrich
  Andrey Kuznetsov
  Giovanni Lapentti
  Kei Nishikori

WTA entrants

Seeds

 Seedings are based on the rankings as of June 7, 2010.

Other entrants
The following players received wildcards into the main draw:
  Elena Baltacha
  Anne Keothavong
  Svetlana Kuznetsova

The following players qualified for the main draw:
  Ekaterina Makarova
  Karolina Šprem
  Heather Watson
  Aleksandra Wozniak

Finals

Men's singles

 Michaël Llodra defeated  Guillermo García-López, 7–5, 6–2
It was Llodra's 2nd title of the year and 5th of his career.

Women's singles

 Ekaterina Makarova defeated  Victoria Azarenka 7–6(7–5), 6–4
It was Makarova's first career title.

Men's doubles

 Mariusz Fyrstenberg /  Marcin Matkowski defeated  Colin Fleming /  Ken Skupski 6–3, 5–7, [10–8]

Women's doubles

 Lisa Raymond /  Rennae Stubbs defeated  Květa Peschke /  Katarina Srebotnik, 6–2, 2–6, [13–11]

References

External links
 Official website

Aegon International
Aegon International
Eastbourne International
Aegon International
June 2010 sports events in the United Kingdom